Goodsprings Schoolhouse, built in the Colonial Revival style, is located in Goodsprings, Nevada, and is listed on the United States National Register of Historic Places.

History 
The school was designed by C.W. Price, built by Norman Price in 1913  and opened in September 1913.

The site was listed as a School District MPS in the National Register of Historic Places on March 10, 1992.

References

Further reading
 

Buildings and structures in Clark County, Nevada
Defunct schools in Nevada
Schoolhouses in the United States
National Register of Historic Places in Clark County, Nevada
School buildings on the National Register of Historic Places in Nevada
1913 establishments in Nevada
School buildings completed in 1913